The North Belfast News is a weekly newspaper published by the Belfast Media Group in Belfast, Northern Ireland, UK.

External links
North Belfast News

Newspapers published in Northern Ireland
Mass media in Belfast